Spamchek is the trade name for a range of managed email services developed
and operated by ENIDAN Technologies GmbH in Herrliberg, Switzerland. Starting in 2004, this was initially a spam filtering tool, which was complemented in 2009 by an email archiving application. In the EU, Spamchek is represented by ENIDAN Technologies Ltd., a UK-based wholly owned subsidiary of ENIDAN Technologies GmbH. Spamchek is a registered European Community trademark, registration #6106272.

References
 Spamchek gets US wholesale customers, IT Reseller Online (German)
 "Yodi" worm comes with e-mails - as a disguised greeting card (German)
 B2B spam filters, IT Reseller Online (German)
 Commercial register of the Zürich canton: ENIDAN Technologies GmbH

Technology companies of Switzerland